KK Pelister is a men's professional basketball club based in Bitola, North Macedonia. They currently play in the Macedonian League and the ABA League Second Division.

History
The club was founded in 1948. Pelister is one of the most representative Clubs in Macedonia. The name changed many times in the rich history of the Club such as : Mladost Metalec (92-96), Pelister (96-06), Swisslion Pelister (06-09), Pelister (09-11), Pelister Sport (11-14), Pelister (14-15), KK Pelister AD Bitola (2015). They are competing for many decades in the top Macedonian leagues. They won 3 titles Champions of Macedonia. First one was in 1975. Second one came in 1989 and the last one 3rd title came in 1991. Since then they played in the play-offs few times and also in the Macedonian Cup Finals but they did not manage to win.

Honours

Macedonian Champions
 1st: Winners (3): 1975, 1989, 1991

Macedonian League
 2nd (1):  2022 3rd (3):  2006, 2007, 2009 Macedonian D2 Runner-Up - 2012

Macedonian Cup 2nd: Finalist - 2009 3rd: Semifinalist - 2008'Home arena

Mladost Sports Hall is a multi-purpose sports arena located in Bitola, North Macedonia. It was built in 1975 by the citizens of Bitola and is mainly used for handball by RK Pelister and RK Bitola, and for basketball by KK Pelister. There is also room for bowling and table tennis plus it has been used for concerts. The Arena hosted the 2007 Macedonian Basketball Cup. This sports hall was the largest on the territory of North Macedonia before the construction of the Boris Trajkovski Sports Center in Skopje.

On 21 July 2009, the arena is undergoing renovation. A new parquet floor will be installed along with new seats. The locker rooms will also be updated to meet EHF standards. Total cost of the project is about €30,000.

In January 2017, renovation of interior of the hall started. The renovation covered the floor, the stands, a new score board and a new heating system. The first match in the renovated arena was played on April 6, 2017 with the match between RK Pelister and RK Metalurg in the second round of the handball Super League play-off.

At the end of July 2018, the name of the hall was changed to "Boro Churlevski", in honor of the late Boro Churlevski, a former handball player from Bitola.Churlevski Arena has a capacity of 4000 sits.

The Bellies (Čkembari)
Abdomens are an Ultras group, established in 1985, who support the Macedonian sports clubs from Bitola that compete under the Pelister'' banner, mainly FK Pelister in football and RK Pelister in handball. The group was founded in 1985 when a caravan of 15 buses traveled to support RK Pelister who was playing against Partizan Bjelovar in a handball relegation play-off match. At that time they used the name BMČM - Bitolčani, Motorcyclists, Čkembari, Macedonians (македонски: БМЧМ - Битолчани, Мотокари, Чкембари, Македонци) later shortened to just Čkembari. Soon after, the first green and white banners were created that read: "Hell Boys" (македонски: Пеколни момци) and "Green Conquerors" (македонски: Зелени освојувачи) which started organized support for Pelister at every match. After Eurofarm Rabotnik and Pelister merged, Čkembari became their supporters.

Current roster

Depth chart

Notable players

 Zoran Petkovski
 Gjorgji Talevski
 Dimitar Karadžovski
 Daniel Zaharievski
 Petar Apcev
 Branko Mirković
 Milan Miljković
 Marko Čakarević
 Aleksandar Kalanj
 Đorđe Jovanović
 Miloš Pejanović
 Boško Jovović
 Aleksandar Held
 Igor Kesar
 Nikola Malešević
 Keoni Watson

References

External links
 Team info at MKF
 Eurobasket.com KK Pelister Page

Basketball teams in North Macedonia
Sport in Bitola